Pic de Peguera is a mountain of Catalonia, Spain. Located in the Pyrenees, it has an elevation of 2,980 metres above sea level.

References

Mountains of Catalonia
Mountains of the Pyrenees
Two-thousanders of Spain